The Minnesota Swarm are a lacrosse team based in Minnesota playing in the National Lacrosse League (NLL). The 2005 season was the Swarm's inaugural season in the NLL.

The Swarm won the first game in franchise history, 12-11 on New Year's Day in Rochester, and after losing to Toronto and Buffalo, they beat the San Jose Stealth to even their record at 2-2. The Swarm then lost seven in a row, before finally winning their first home game. They finished the season 5-11 and last in the East.

Regular season

Conference standings

Game log
Reference:

Player stats
Reference:

Runners (Top 10)

Note: GP = Games played; G = Goals; A = Assists; Pts = Points; LB = Loose Balls; PIM = Penalty Minutes

Goaltenders
Note: GP = Games played; MIN = Minutes; W = Wins; L = Losses; GA = Goals against; Sv% = Save percentage; GAA = Goals against average

Awards

Transactions

Trades

Roster
Reference:

See also
2005 NLL season

References

Minnesota
Minnesota Swarm